Rieber-Mohn is the surname of:

 Georg Fredrik Rieber-Mohn (born 1945), Norwegian judge
 Hallvard Rieber-Mohn (1922–1982), Norwegian writer
 Libe Rieber-Mohn (born 1965), Norwegian politician

See also
Rieber (disambiguation)
Mohn (disambiguation)

Norwegian-language surnames
Compound surnames